In Chinese traditional culture, regarding playing Gu-qin, the player should avoid six kinds of occasions:

Avoid the time of learning of someone's death;
Avoid the time of crying sorrowfully;
Avoid the time of being busy with something else;
Avoid the time of being angry;
Avoid the time of sex;
Avoid the time of astonishment.

See also
 Seven Should-not-plays (Chinese Music)

References
 The Six Avoidances in playing Gu-qin is recorded in "Jing Shi Tong Yan", which is a Chinese ancient collection of novels written by Feng Meng-long (Feng Menglong) of Ming Dynasty.
 The Six Avoidances in playing Gu-qin is also addressed in a Chinese classical literature masterpiece "Feng Shen Bang" (Gods of Honor).

External links
 Chinese Music and Chinese Musical Instruments

Guqin